George Hogg may refer to:
 George Hogg (adventurer) (1915–1945), English adventurer
 George Hogg (footballer) (1869–?), Scottish footballer
 George Hogg (priest) (born 1910), Archdeacon of Cashel and Emly
 Brad Hogg (George Bradley Hogg, born 1971), Australian cricketer
 George Alfred Hogg, member of the crew of the RMS Titanic (lookout)